Frank Rowlands (26 July 1889 – 6 September 1975) was an English cricketer. He played for Gloucestershire between 1920 and 1922.

References

1889 births
1975 deaths
English cricketers
Gloucestershire cricketers
Cricketers from Bristol